Cryptandra ciliata is a species of flowering plant in the family Rhamnaceae and is endemic to south-eastern Queensland. It is a shrub with clustered linear leaves and densely-hairy, white, tube-shaped flowers.

Description
The upper surface of the leaves is glabrous and the edges are rolled under, usually obscuring most of the lower surface. The flowers are white and borne singly in leaf axils, sometimes forming clusters of up to 10 near the ends of branchlets, each flower with 7 to 10 bracts at the base.

Taxonomy and naming
Cryptandra ciliata was first formally described in 2004 by Anthony Bean in the journal Austrobaileya from specimens collected near Cracow by Paul Irwin Forster in 1990. The specific epithet (ciliata) means "fringed with fine hairs", referring to the bracts.

Distribution and habitat
This cryptandra grows in woodland on sandstone ridges and slopes from the Barakula State Forest to near Theodore in south-east Queensland.

References

ciliata
Rosales of Australia
Flora of Queensland
Plants described in 2004
Taxa named by Anthony Bean